Roger Federer defeated Jo-Wilfried Tsonga in the final, 6–1, 7–6(7–3) to win the singles tennis title at the 2011 Paris Masters. He did not lose a single set in the entire tournament.

Robin Söderling was the defending champion, but did not participate due to mononucleosis.

Seeds
All seeds received a bye into the second round.

Qualifying

Draw

Finals

Top half

Section 1

Section 2

Bottom half

Section 3

Section 4

References
 Main Draw

BNP Paribas Masters - Singles
2011 BNP Paribas Masters